Pol (DNA polymerase) refers to a gene in retroviruses, or the protein produced by that gene.

Products of pol include:

Reverse transcriptase

Common to all retroviruses, this enzyme transcribes the viral RNA into double-stranded DNA.

Integrase

This enzyme integrates the DNA produced by reverse transcriptase into the host's genome.

Protease

A protease is any enzyme that cuts proteins into segments. HIV's gag and pol genes do not produce their proteins in their final form, but as larger combination proteins; the specific protease used by HIV cleaves these into separate functional units. Protease inhibitor drugs block this step.

See also
Gag/pol translational readthrough site

External links
 
 

Viral structural proteins